Zappa Records is an American record label based in Los Angeles which was founded by Frank Zappa in 1977. It was mostly inactive during the 1980s and 1990s, but was revived in 2006 by the Zappa Family Trust.

History 
In May 1976, Zappa ended his relationship with manager and business partner Herb Cohen. The pair had co-owned DiscReet Records which was distributed by Warner Bros. Records. Zappa then left Warner and DiscReet following a series of disagreements and lawsuits in 1977.

Around mid 1977, Zappa founded Zappa Records, and negotiated a deal with Phonogram Inc., to distribute the label's releases in the United States and Canada. Under this agreement Zappa planned to release a four-LP box set titled Läther (pronounced "Leather".) The album was scheduled for release on Halloween, October 31, 1977, but production was cancelled at the test pressing stage. Zappa and Phonogram were forced to shelve the package following a legal threat from Warner.

The first release by Zappa Records was Sheik Yerbouti in May 1979. This was soon followed by the dystopian rock opera Joe's Garage later in the year. The Joe's Garage project initially had to be released in two parts. The first was a single LP, Joe's Garage, Act I (September 1979), followed by a two-LP set Joe's Garage, Acts II and III (November 1979.)

The album Touch Me There, by L. Shankar, was also released on Zappa Records in 1979. Frank Zappa produced the album, sang, and co-wrote some of the songs.

In early 1980 Phonogram refused to distribute the Zappa single I Don't Wanna Get Drafted in the United States, though they did distribute the record in Canada. According to Zappa, this was because a Phonogram executive objected to the lyrics. The song criticized US president Jimmy Carter's reintroduction of the military draft. Phonogram president Robert Sherwood disputed Zappa's version of the story, insisting that they did not want to release a single without the support of a full length album. Zappa distributed the single independently in the US and elsewhere through CBS Records.

In 1981 Zappa founded Barking Pumpkin Records with distribution by CBS Records.

In 2006, the Zappa Records label was revived with the release of Dweezil Zappa's Go with What You Know and Frank Zappa's Imaginary Diseases and Trance-Fusion on Zappa Records, followed by The Dub Room Special (2007), One Shot Deal (2008) and Feeding the Monkies At Ma Maison (2011).

In 2012, the Zappa Family Trust regained control of Frank Zappa's recorded output and made a distribution deal with Universal Music Enterprises to reissue the recordings on the Zappa and Barking Pumpkin labels.

Artists 

 Former

References

External links 
Official site

Frank Zappa
American independent record labels